Checkered Ninja is a 2018 Danish computer-animated comedy-drama film, directed by Anders Matthesen, and Thorbjørn Christoffersen, and based on Matthesen's 2016 novel Ternet Ninja. It stars Anders Matthesen and Alfred Bjerre Larsen.

The film was released on December 25, 2018, to positive response and box office success.

The film was dubbed to English in 2019, with an Irish cast, and the dubbed version was released on Amazon Prime and iTunes. The international sales of the film has been handled by LevelK Film while the dubbing was done by Moetion Films.

Plot
In Thailand, Danish businessman Philip Eberfø arrives to check on his new factory. As a boy accidentally uses his scarf to create a checkered ninja doll, Eberfø brutally beats him to death. At that moment, lightning strikes, causing the doll to be possessed by the spirit of Taiko Nakamura. As the Checkered Ninja ends up on a Danish cargo ship, he is picked up by Stewart Stardust, who gives the doll to his nephew Aske Stenstrøm as a birthday present. After the Ninja defends Aske's friend from a bully named Glenn, Aske learns that the doll is alive, and the two quickly become friends. The Checkered Ninja promises to help Alex, in exchange for revenge against Eberfø.

Alex and the Ninja challenge Glenn to a fight, which Aske wins, causing Aske's love interest Jessica to invite him to her party. However, as the Ninja believes they should move on with the mission, Aske joins him unwillingly, and they arrive at Eberfø's house where the Ninja attempts to kill him. Eberfø escapes, and as Aske becomes angry with the Ninja for being too brutal, the Ninja makes Aske seem insane, causing Aske to be imprisoned in an asylum. While in the asylum, Aske and the Ninja strike a deal to bring down Eberfø without killing him: Aske inserts a packet of cocaine into the Checkered Ninja's body, intending to frame Eberfø for possession of illegal drugs, and follows Eberfø to the airport. As Eberfø arrives in Thailand, the Checkered Ninja jumps onto him. Police subsequently find Eberfø carrying the cocaine-stuffed Ninja, and Eberfø is promptly arrested.

Cast

Reception
Jordan Mintzner of The Hollywood Reporter gave the film a positive review, summarizing it as "Clever and a bit crude". The film also sold over 1 million tickets in Denmark, making it the highest-grossing Danish film since Op på fars hat from 1986.

The film won three Robert Awards, for Best Children's Film, Best Adapted Screenplay, and Best Original Song ("Skubber det sne"). It was also nominated for the Bodil Award for Best Danish Film.

Music

Music for the film was composed by Christian Vinten, while six original songs were written and performed by Anders Matthesen, and produced by Kewan Padré. The singles "Pesto" and "Pushing the Snow" was also released independently. The English versions of the songs were sung by the Danish hip-hop singer Waqas Qadri according to the credits of the English dub version of the film.

Sequel 
A sequel, Checkered Ninja 2 (Ternet Ninja 2) was announced, based on Anders Matthesen's sequel to the original novel which was published in 2019. The film was released on August 19, 2021, and saw Anders Matthesen and Thorbjørn Christoffersen return as directors. The film went into production in late 2019 with a budget of 8,000,000 DKK (1,319,108.80 US dollars) provided by the Danish Film Institute.

References

External links
 
 

2018 films
Danish animated films